Brian Fleming (born 20 July 1946) is a former Irish Fine Gael politician who served both as a Teachta Dála (TD) and as a Senator.

Fleming was first elected to Dáil Éireann as a Fine Gael TD for the Dublin West constituency at the 1981 general election, and held the seat at the February 1982 general election. He lost his seat at the November 1982 general election and was an unsuccessful candidate at the 1987 general election.

From 1983 to 1987, he served as a member of Seanad Éireann, elected on the Cultural and Educational Panel.

References

1946 births
Living people
Fine Gael TDs
Members of the 22nd Dáil
Members of the 23rd Dáil
Members of the 17th Seanad
Irish schoolteachers
Fine Gael senators